December 2022 North American blizzard may refer to:

Tornado outbreak of December 12–15, 2022#Non-tornadic impacts December 12–15, 2022 blizzard (Affected the Great Plains in the United States)
Late December 2022 North American winter storm December 21–23 blizzard (Affected much of Canada and the United States)